The Linsly School, formerly known as the Linsly Military Institute, is a boarding and day school located in Wheeling, West Virginia. It was founded in 1814 by Noah Linsly and chartered by the State of Virginia in the same year. The school is the oldest preparatory school west of the Alleghenies. It was originally known as the Lancastrian Academy.

History

In 1861, the school adopted the dress and discipline of an all-boys military school.

The Linsly Institute building (erected 1858) in Wheeling, served as the state's first capitol building from statehood in 1863 until March 28, 1870, when the capital transferred to Charleston.

In 1978, the board of trustees voted to change the military structure and adopt a traditional boys preparatory school philosophy.

In 1988, Linsly became a co-educational school.

In 2007, Linsly ranged from 5th to 12th grade with a student body of about 420.

In the 2017–2018 school year, the school enrolled 431 students in grades 5–12.

In celebration of Linsly's 200th academic year, the school campaigned to raise $10,000,000 for an addition to Banes Hall, the main academic building, renovations to many other on-campus facilities, and to enrich Linsly's instructing capability. Currently, the school has completed all major on-campus renovations.

Linsly has a 100% college acceptance rate for its graduating seniors. As a day and boarding school, Linsly is home to international students from many countries, including China, Finland, Canada, South Korea, Spain, Argentina, Costa Rica, Germany, Italy, Serbia, Brazil, and Japan.

Notable alumni
Carl G. Bachmann 1908, former United States congressman
Ashley Battle 2000, WNBA player for the New York Liberty
Bill Berrehsem, former professional football player
Ted Brown (politician) 1978, libertarian politician and speaker
Jack Canfield 1962, Author of the Chicken Soup for the Soul book series
Willie Clay 1988, NFL football player and sports commentator
Eddie Drummond 1998, NFL football player
C. J. Goodwin 2008, NFL football player and philanthropist
Heath Haynes 1987, MLB baseball player
Jon Robert Holden 1994, former professional basketball player
 Tom Keane 1944, NFL football player and coach
Brad Paisley (attended but did not graduate), country singer and musician
Chris Stirewalt, digital politics editor for the Fox News Channel
 Robert E. L. Strider, president of Colby College
 Jason Wilson (politician) 1987, Member of the Ohio Senate

Notable staff
Skip Prosser, Basketball Coach (1977–1979)

Sources
 Official Website
 The Association of Boarding Schools profile

References

Educational institutions established in 1814
Boarding schools in West Virginia
Private high schools in West Virginia
Military high schools in the United States
Schools in Ohio County, West Virginia
Private middle schools in West Virginia
Preparatory schools in West Virginia
Buildings and structures in Wheeling, West Virginia
1814 establishments in Virginia